Anker Innovations Co., Ltd, commonly known as Anker, is a Chinese electronics manufacturer based in Changsha, Hunan, China. The company's product range includes phone chargers, power banks, earbuds, headphones, speakers, data hubs, charging cables, torches, and screen protectors, among other products.

History
Anker was founded in 2011 by Steven Yang in Shenzhen, Guangdong, but the company soon moved its headquarters to Changsha, Hunan. In 2011, Anker expanded its focus from replacement laptop batteries to smartphone battery chargers, wall chargers, portable power and conferencing gear. In early 2014, Anker Innovations hired Zhao Dongping, Google's then-head of sales in China, who eventually became president in 2020.

Availability
Aside from its domestic market in China, Anker also maintains subsidiaries in Japan, Singapore, the United States, and the United Kingdom. Prior to 2016, Anker products were almost exclusively sold on the Amazon Marketplace. Anker products are also now sold in big box stores such as Best Buy, Target and Kohl's. They are also available on various other e-commerce websites such as Shopee and other third-party websites in agreement with Anker.

Brands and products
Anker makes power banks, charging cables, wall adapters, power strips, USB hubs, and torches under the Bolder sub-brand. Soundcore makes Bluetooth earbuds, headphones, and speakers. Eufy produces smart home appliances and security devices. Nebula makes portable video projectors. Roav makes car accessories. Zolo was a precursor to the Soundcore brand. KARAPAX made phone cases.

Anker's line of charging cables have the trademarked name PowerLine, with the latest being PowerLine III. These cables have an MFi (Made for iPhone) certification from Apple.

Gallery

Controversies 
One of Anker's sub-brands, Eufy, claimed that all data recorded was stored locally with no cloud access and further claimed that only the owner had access to their data. However, security researcher Paul Moore found out that images and videos were uploaded to Eufy's servers, leased through AWS, and used to train a facial recognition AI. Additionally, these images were tagged with user data. Even after deleting the images and his Eufy account, Moore found that the images remained on their AWS servers. This led to several sponsored entities, such as Linus Tech Tips, dropping Anker as a sponsor. In December 2022, The Verge reported that Eufy had drastically changed its 'privacy commitment' page, removing many of their previous statements on the privacy aspects of its cameras.

Notes

References

External links
 Official website
 Anker Oman Official website

Companies based in Shenzhen
Mobile technology companies
Technology companies established in 2011
Chinese companies established in 2011
Chinese brands